Gabriel Chernacov (born 17 April 1954) is a Costa Rican alpine skier. He competed in the men's giant slalom at the 1992 Winter Olympics.

References

1954 births
Living people
Costa Rican male alpine skiers
Olympic alpine skiers of Costa Rica
Alpine skiers at the 1992 Winter Olympics
Place of birth missing (living people)